Maxentius (c. 283–312) was a Roman Emperor.

Maxentius may also refer to:

People
 Saint Maxentius (c. 445–c. 515), French saint
 Maxentius of Aquileia (died 1837), Italian Patriarch
 Joannes Maxentius (6th century), Byzantine leader of Scythian monks

Other uses
 Maxentius (insect), a genus of cricket-like insect in the family Stenopelmatidae
 Basilica of Maxentius, an ancient building in the Roman Forum, Rome, Italy

See also
 Maximus (disambiguation)